Crossroads is a rural locality in the Western Downs Region, Queensland, Australia.

Geography 
The Condamine Kogan Road traverses the locality from south-east (Hopeland / Montrose) to south-west (Nangram /Wieambilla). The Chinchilla Tara Road traverses the locality from north (Greenswamp) to south (Wieambilla). These two roads intersect in roughly the centre of the locality and presumably provide the name for the locality.

Gunbarwood is a neighbourhood. It presumably takes its name from the Gunbarwood rural property.

The land use is a mixture of dry and irrigated crops and grazing on native vegetation.

Coal seam gas is extracted throughout the locality.

History 

Education 
There are no schools in Crossroads. The nearest primary and secondary schools are Chinchilla State School and Chinchilla State High School in neighbouring Chinchilla to the north-east.

References 

Western Downs Region
Localities in Queensland